X-way crossing may refer to:

 Pedestrian scramble
 A predecessor to the Pelican crossing